Man Woman Life Death Infinity is the 25th album by the Australian alternative rock band The Church, released in October 2017.

The album was the second by the band to feature the lineup of Steve Kilbey, Peter Koppes, Tim Powles, and Ian Haug.  Haug joined the band in 2013 following the departure of longtime guitarist Marty Willson-Piper, and, according to Powles, was "surprised to discover how much improvisation was involved in the writing process" of the band; Powles went on to note that Man Woman Life Death Infinity was a unique record for the band because prior to recording, they set aside time to structure the songs instead of relying largely upon improvisation during the recording process.

Matt Collar at AllMusic gave the album four stars, stating that it "sounds utterly fresh, even as it's in keeping with their early albums. Rather than backing away from the gothy, new wave psychedelia of their youth, just as they revisited The Blurred Crusade, here they've embraced that aesthetic and imbued it with the emotional maturity and poetic gravitas that comes with their decades-long space rock journey.

The album spawned two singles prior to its release.  The first single, "Another Century", was released on June 23, 2017.  The album's second single, "Undersea", was released on September 8, 2017.

Track listing

References 

The Church (band) albums